Meriden is a constituency represented in the House of Commons of the UK Parliament since 2019 by Saqib Bhatti, a Conservative. It is named after the village of Meriden, halfway between Solihull and Coventry.

Members of Parliament 
The MP from 1997 to 2019 was the Conservative Caroline Spelman. Conservative Saqib Bhatti took over the position after the 2019 General Election.

Constituency profile
The constituency is one of two covering the Metropolitan Borough of Solihull. It covers the rural area known as the Meriden Gap located between the West Midlands conurbation and Coventry, which contains villages such as Balsall Common, Hampton-in-Arden, and Meriden itself, with some suburban towns, particularly Castle Bromwich and Chelmsley Wood (a large area of 1960s council housing on the eastern edge of Birmingham, some of which since acquired privately under the right to buy others of which being remaining social housing), higher than average national income and affluent areas particular examples being Hockley Heath, Bentley Heath, Temple Balsall, Catherine-de-Barnes, Dorridge and Knowle.  Incidence of home ownership in this area is high, as opposed to the rented sector.

History
Meriden is the largest geographical constituency in the West Midlands metropolitan area.  It was created for the 1955 general election.

The 1983 boundary changes and landslide electoral success of Margaret Thatcher that year transformed the constituency into a Conservative safe seat, with the Labour-leaning areas becoming part of the new Warwickshire North constituency (which was also won by the Conservatives). Iain Mills held this seat until he died in office in January 1997, with the seat remaining vacant until the dissolution of Parliament that March (and therefore no by-election being held). Caroline Spelman was victorious in the 1997 general election, though on that occasion only by a marginal majority, and held the seat until her retirement in 2019, with the challenge from Labour becoming more distant.

Boundaries 

The constituency was created in 1955 following a review of parliamentary seats in Warwickshire by the Boundary Commission appointed under the House of Commons (Redistribution of Seats) Act 1949. The constituency's area was transferred from the neighbouring constituencies of Nuneaton and Sutton Coldfield.

Tamworth Rural District was abolished in 1965, with most of its area redistributed between the two neighbouring rural districts. Accordingly, this resulted in only a minor boundary change to the constituency in 1974.

Until 1983 the seat was a Labour-Conservative marginal, covering the coal mining areas of northern Warwickshire and the more affluent area near Solihull.  It changed hands between the two parties several times, including in a by-election in 1968, which was won by Keith Speed of the Conservatives.

In 1983, reflecting the major local government boundary changes effected by the Local Government Act 1972, a new Meriden County Constituency was created as part of the parliamentary county of West Midlands. There were no boundary changes in 1997. The Conservatives have generally achieved solid majorities in the constituency since 1983, although Labour came within 582 votes of gaining the seat in its 1997 landslide.

1955–1974: The Rural Districts of Atherstone, Meriden, and Tamworth.

1974–1983: The Rural Districts of Atherstone and Meriden.

1983–2010: The Metropolitan Borough of Solihull wards of Bickenhill, Castle Bromwich, Chelmsley Wood, Fordbridge, Kingshurst, Knowle, Meriden, Packwood, and Smith's Wood.

2010–present: The Metropolitan Borough of Solihull wards of Bickenhill, Blythe, Castle Bromwich, Chelmsley Wood, Dorridge and Hockley Heath, Kingshurst and Fordbridge, Knowle, Meriden, and Smith's Wood.

Elections

Elections in the 2010s

Elections in the 2000s

Elections in the 1990s

Elections in the 1980s

Elections in the 1970s

Elections in the 1960s

Elections in the 1950s

See also 
 List of parliamentary constituencies in the West Midlands (county)

Notes

References

Politics of Solihull
Parliamentary constituencies in the West Midlands (county)
Constituencies of the Parliament of the United Kingdom established in 1955